Donald Harnish Fleming (August 7, 1923, Hagerstown, Maryland  June 16, 2008, Cambridge, Massachusetts) was Jonathan  Trumbull  Professor  of  American  History at Harvard University. He specialized in American and European intellectual history and the history of science and medicine.

Biography
Fleming graduated from Johns Hopkins University with AB in 1943 and from Harvard University with AM in 1944 and PhD in 1947. From 1947 to 1959 he was a faculty member of Brown University's history department. After spending the academic year 1958–1959 as a professor at Yale University, he  joined in 1959 the faculty of Harvard University's history department. He remained a professor there until 1999, when he retired as professor emeritus. He was from 1963 to 1965 the chair of the department and from 1973 to 1980 the director of the Charles Warren Center for Studies in American History. He was from 1967 to 1986 the co-editor, with Bernard Bailyn, of the journal Perspectives in American History, an annual volume of monographic essays.

Fleming was a lifelong bachelor. His cremated remains were buried at Harvard Hill in Mt. Auburn Cemetery, Cambridge.

Awards and honors
 1948 — Beveridge Award of the American Historical Association
 1962 — elected a member of the American Academy of Arts and Sciences
 1965 — Guggenheim Fellow for the academic year 1965–1966

Selected publications

Articles

Books

References

1923 births
2008 deaths
20th-century American historians
American male non-fiction writers
21st-century American historians
Johns Hopkins University alumni
Harvard University faculty
Brown University faculty
Yale University faculty
Fellows of the American Academy of Arts and Sciences
Harvard University alumni
20th-century American male writers